The 2018 SMU Mustangs women's soccer team represented Southern Methodist University during the 2018 NCAA Division I women's soccer season. The regular season began on August 16 and concluded on October 26. It was the program's 25th season fielding a women's varsity soccer team, and their 6th season in the AAC. The 2018 season was Chris Petrucelli's seventh year as head coach for the program.

Roster

Schedule 

|-
!colspan=6 style=""| Non-conference regular season
|-

|-
!colspan=6 style=""| American Athletic Conference regular season
|-

|-
!colspan=6 style=""| American Athletic Conference Tournament
|-

|-

References

2018 American Athletic Conference women's soccer season
2018 in sports in Texas
SMU Mustangs women's soccer